The San Ignacio Province is one of thirteen provinces located in the Cajamarca Region of Peru. The capital of this province is the city of San Ignacio.

Boundaries
North: Ecuador
East: Amazonas Region
South: Jaén Province
West: Piura Region

Political division

San Ignacio
Chirinos
Huarango
La Coipa
Namballe
San José de Lourdes
Tabaconas

Population
The province has a population of 127,523 inhabitants as of census 2005.

See also
Cajamarca Region
Peru

External links
  Official San Ignacio website

Provinces of the Cajamarca Region